Zhou Hanming (born 18 October 1980, in Guangzhou, Guangdong) is a Chinese Sabre fencer, who competed at the 2004 and 2008 Summer Olympics.

Major performances
2004 World Cup France - 2nd team;
2004 Olympic Games - 7th team

See also
China at the 2008 Summer Olympics

References

1980 births
Living people
Chinese male fencers
Fencers at the 2004 Summer Olympics
Fencers at the 2008 Summer Olympics
Olympic fencers of China
Asian Games medalists in fencing
Fencers at the 2002 Asian Games
Fencers at the 2006 Asian Games
Asian Games gold medalists for China
Asian Games silver medalists for China
Asian Games bronze medalists for China
Medalists at the 2002 Asian Games
Medalists at the 2006 Asian Games
Fencers from Guangzhou